Tomi Strock is an American politician and a Republican member of the Wyoming House of Representatives representing the 6th district since January 10, 2023.

Political career

Strock ran against incumbent Republican representative Aaron Clausen in the Republican primary on August 16, 2022, and narrowly defeated Clausen by 56 votes with 51% of the vote. She then won the general election on November 8, 2022, defeating independent candidate Bruce Jones and Democratic nominee Hank Szramkowski with 64% of the vote.

References

External links
Profile from Ballotpedia

Living people
Republican Party members of the Wyoming House of Representatives
People from Douglas, Wyoming
Women state legislators in Wyoming
21st-century American politicians
Year of birth missing (living people)